The National Institute of Food and Agriculture (NIFA) is a U.S. federal government body whose creation was mandated in the Food, Conservation, and Energy Act of 2008.  Its purpose is to consolidate all federally funded agricultural research, and it is subordinate to the Department of Agriculture.  It replaced the Cooperative State Research, Education, and Extension Service in 2009. , Dionne Toombs has served as the Acting Director.

The mission of the National Institute of Food and Agriculture (NIFA), an agency of the U.S. Department of Agriculture (USDA), is to stimulate and fund the research and technological innovations that will enhance American agriculture and make it more productive and environmentally sustainable while ensuring the economic viability of agriculture and production. The Institute was developed as a result of a task force chaired by William Henry Danforth and appointed by then-Secretary of Agriculture Ann Veneman. The Danforth Task Force recommended that Congress authorize the creation of NIFA as a way to strengthen agriculture research and to attract additional highly competitive research scientists to this field of endeavor. A growing program in competitive research grants will be a hallmark of the new agency. The creation of NIFA strengthened USDA's competitive research portfolio by replacing the National Research Initiative with the Agriculture and Food Research Initiative. NIFA awards research funding through a combination of competitive grants and funds allocated to states under statutory formulas.

See also
 Agriculture Innovation Center
 Electrical energy efficiency on United States farms

References

External links
 
 National Institute of Food and Agriculture in the Federal Register
 Research and Education Activities account on USAspending.gov
 Extension Activities account on USAspending.gov
 Integrated Activities account on USAspending.gov

United States Department of Agriculture
Agricultural organizations based in the United States